Kyle John Echarri (born June 20, 2003) is a Filipino-American singer and actor. He made his first television appearance at the age of eleven when he joined season 2 of The Voice Kids. He has appeared in various films and television shows such as On the Wings of Love, Seven Sundays, Maalaala Mo Kaya, Kadenang Ginto, Silly Red Shoes, Huwag Kang Mangamba, and The Iron Heart

Early life
Kyle John Paradillo Echarri was born in Orange County, California. His family moved to Cebu City, Philippines in June 2014. He is the son of Jose “Joe” Echarri and Marie Paradillo-Echarri. His father is of Spanish descent. He has an older brother named Anthony (Nico) and a younger sister named Isabella Rae (Bella).

Music

2015-2017: Career Beginnings
Echarri rose to prominence and made his first television appearance at the age of eleven when he joined season 2 of The Voice Kids, where he landed Top 6 under Sarah Geronimo's Team. Just six seconds after he started singing One Direction's "Night Changes" during the blind auditions, Coaches Bamboo and Sarah already turned for the then 11-year-old Cebuano footballer eventually choosing to be part of Team Sarah.

Echarri released his first full-length studio album, It's Me Kyle, on August 26, 2016, under MCA Music, a Universal Music Group company in the Philippines. His carrier single, "Fall For Me" peaked at Number 4 on Myx's Pinoy MYX Countdown and was on the charts for more than 3 months and 2 weeks (14 weeks). In 2016, Echarri opened the Manila Tour show for the American singer, songwriter, and YouTube viral-hit artist, Greyson Chance. In January 2017, Echarri was part of the line-up for Fusion 2017, a Philippine Music Festival highlighting Original Pilipino Music, with other Filipino artists – Sarah Geronimo, Bamboo Mañalac, Aegis, 6cyclemind, Gabby Alipe, Autotelic, Yeng Constantino, Lyca Gairanod, Zendee, James Reid, and Nadine Lustre. The Philippine Daily Inquirer compared his talents to those of Justin Bieber.

2018-2019: Rising Popularity
In 2018, Echarri became the latest recording artist to join Star Pop Star Music's record sublabel for the younger market.  He successfully launched his latest single titled "Pangako" and it was soon followed by a music video released. The singer-actor first performed the song live in the MYX Music Awards 2018 held at the Araneta Coliseum and launched it on radio through MOR 101.9. The single immediately joined the daily top hits survey, MOR Pinoy Biga10, and has stayed in the charts for weeks.

Echarri became a member of a teen pop group titled ASAP G!. Other members of the group are Isabela Vinzon, Jayda Avanzado, Ylona Garcia, Jeremy Glinoga, and Darren Espanto. The group formed on June 3, 2018, and disbanded in November 2018, when the show was reformatted into ASAP Natin 'To.

He also became a part of the Star Magic Circle artist and the “Gold Squad” in 2018. The Gold Squad refers to the four teen stars of the top-rated series Kadenang Ginto namely Francine Diaz, Andrea Brillantes, and Seth Fedelin. In 2019, the Gold Squad members debuted their first album under Star Music titled "The Gold Squad - EP". This album consisted of five tracks including their famous dance craze song "Halo Halo" serving as the album's title track. They also released four new music videos including a new music video for Echarri's reprise breakout hit song “Pangako” featuring his on-screen partner Francine Diaz.

2020-Present: Singer-songwriter, New Views
Echarri has continued to make music, releasing multiple singles, and two albums. He has always been very vocal about wanting to write his own songs, so it was no surprised that he branches out and become a singer-songwriter. In year 2020, he released his latest single titled “I’m Serious”. This young artist wrote the words and music of the track and produced the song under Star POP with the guidance and supervision of label head, Rox Santos. The release of his latest song marked as his first successful solo project as singer-songwriter. The song won People's Choice Award for “Dance Recording of the Year” in 13th PMPC Star Awards for Music.

In 2021, just in time for his 18th birthday, he released his latest album, “New Views” which shows his growth as a singer-songwriter and as a music producer. According to the artist, he did not approach the project with a certain theme or vibe in mind. Instead, he wanted this album to show his versatility, as seen with a diverse slate of songs on the album, from R&B tracked styled to Latin-inspired trap sound. The album consisted of seven songs and also presented collaborations with different artists such as longtime friend Darren Espanto who co-written “Fuego”, his Gold Squad members Seth Fedelin and Andrea Brillantes who co-written “Liligawan Na Kita”, and rapper Arvey. The album hit number 1 in Digital Sales for Original Pinoy Album (OPM) in the Philippines, a day after its release, and reached number 4 album on iTunes Philippines Top 100 Albums. Echarri also shared the exciting news with his fans and followers on Instagram that he will be holding a FREE virtual concert which will be stream live on his Kumu channel on his 18th birthday at 7pm, where he will be performing songs from his new album "New Views" as a thank you gift to his fans who has been supporting him and his journey for the past 6 years since he debuted as a singer. His fan con revealed special guests present like Zephanie Dimaranan, AC Bonifacio, Darren Espanto, and Moira Dela Torre

In 2022, Echarri and his friend Markus Patterson and Moophs released their first-ever collaboration titled “Hotel Room” under Tarsier Records. The track has a deep R&B vibe, combining soulful lyrics and vocals over a neo-soul beat. A month after the release of "Hotel Room". He had another collaboration with Tarsier Records and Moophs. The young artist explored a new sound that embodies a bolder chapter in his music journey and released a new single "Cupid's Aim"

Acting

2015-2017: Acting Debut

Theatre
Kyle Echarri made his first theatrical stint as Master Kundoktor in Ako Ay Si Josephine, a musical show featuring the hits of a Filipino pop-rock singer-songwriter, Yeng Constantino. In December 2016, he was cast in Ballet Philippines' Awitin Mo at Isasayaw Ko, a new dance musical featuring the songs of VST & Co., at the Cultural Center of the Philippines Main Theater (Tanghalang Nicanor Abelardo) in the role of Lito (alternated by Noel Comia). Performers include legendary dancers Edna Vida and Nonoy Froilan, BP mainstays Denise Parungao, Garry Corpuz, Rita Angela Winder and Jean Marc Cordero, and for the vocal parts, ABS-CBN stars Karylle, Michael Pangilinan, Markki Stroem and the alternate cast of Cooky Chua, Sandino Martin, Jef Flores and Noel Comia Jr.

Television

After season 2 of The Voice Kids, Kyle was cast in the top-rating ABS-CBN teleserye On the Wings of Love as Brent Wyatt, the half-brother of Nadine Lustre's character Leah Olivar in 2015. In May 2016, he became part of ABS-CBN's Filipino reality music competition show, We Love OPM, hosted by Anne Curtis, with his teammates – Bailey May and Juan Karlos Labajo, mentored by the crooner Richard Poon. We Love OPM: The Celebrity Sing-Offs ran for three whole months, from May to July 2016. He was one-third of the boy group Voice Next Door. It was in 2017 that he got the role of Gio in an MMK episode entitled "Cellphone". In 2018, he was cast as Miguel in an MMK episode entitled "Hapagkainan".

2018-2020:  Breakthrough, the Gold Squad
In 2018, Echarri was cast as Kristoff "Tope" Tejada in ABS-CBN's top-rated daytime Philippine drama revenge television series,Kadenang Ginto. With the success of the series, the phenomenal group was born called The Gold Squad - a teenage quartet made up by Kyle-Francine-Andrea-Seth, which composed of this generation's most popular young actors. Further proof of the Gold Squad's success is their first ever award. The EdukCircle presented the group with the Outstanding Social Media Personalities of the Year award in 2020. His loveteam with Francine Diaz, with the portmanteau nickname of KyCine became the viewers' favorite and awarded as the Best Loveteam of the Year 2020 in the LionHeart TV Rawr Award In 2019. The Gold Squad starred in several series and films. In 2020 KyCine starred in an iWant digital movie, Silly Red Shoes, directed by James Robin Mayo. The tandem were also cast in Bawal Lumabas: The Series, now on Netflix with an English title Her Rules, Her No's with the leading actress Kim Chiu.   In 2021, Echarri became one of the main cast of Huwag Kang Mangamba, a primetime inspirational teleserye hit, starring alongside the Gold Squad members and other well-known veteran actors in the country. He was also one of the  leading cast of Click, Like, Share a four-part digital anthology series with four different episodes. He was the first actor to star in the said anthology with Danica Ontengco. His episode was titled Reroute in Season 1.

2021-Present: Reality show, Loveteam Separation, Solo Projects and Movies

Pinoy Big Brother: Kumunity Season 10
Echarri entered as a housemate of Kumunity Season 10's Celebrity Edition, having previously entered as a houseguest with the Gold Squad in Otso. He was the fourth evictee of the edition, and he was nominated by almost all of his housemates due to his competitiveness and for not being able to do some house chores.

His time inside the Big Brother house attracted criticism online, from the casual viewers and fans of their loveteam "KyCine", due to his apparent friendship and closeness with fellow housemate and former GirlTrends member Chie Filomeno, including a scene where Echarri cried after Filomeno got evicted as he was also blamed online for her eviction

Post-Pinoy Big Brother 
On a guesting in Magandang Buhay, Echarri clarified that he and Filomeno are friends even before the show, explaining that their closeness was because they both went through a time in showbiz where netizens treated them (individually) on a bad light and, through PBB, felt like they have to prove something and "fighting for our spot inside the house." His on-screen loveteam with Diaz silently dissipated as she moved on to other projects, including Bola Bola with Echarri's fellow housemate KD Estrada.

Solo Projects, Movies 

In February 2022, fresh from his stint in Pinoy Big Brother: Kumunity Season 10, Echarri was added as a main cast for a youth-oriented musical romantic comedy drama streaming television series Lyric and Beat directed by Dolly Dulu. The series premiered on August 10 to September 23, 2022, on iWantTFC. This series pays tribute to the "20 years of music" of ABS-CBN Music's creative director Jonathan Manalo. The show also marked as the young actor's first solo project without the benefit of a love team partner.

In the same year, as reported by the Philippine Star, Echarri will have his first leading role as he had been paired with Francine Diaz in some of ABS-CBN's drama projects and with The Gold Squad previously. His first lead role  Beach Bros is a youth-oriented comedy drama streaming television miniseries by Dreamscape Entertainment and directed by Victor Kaiba Villanueva, which premiered from July 16 to July 31, 2022, on iWantTFC. This series is also the first series for Echarri and Filomeno as a pair, where the two were part of the Celebrity Edition of PBB in 2021.

In November 2022, Echarri played the young "Apollo" Adelantar in the primetime action series The Iron Heart, starring lead actor Richard Gutierrez as his counterpart. Echarri proves his acting prowess and netizens commended his portrayal on the pilot episode. He was paired up with Karina Bautista as the young "Cassandra", played by award-winning actress, Maja Salvador as her counterpart. It was their first time teaming up in a show but based on online reaction, people are gushing over their refreshing chemistry. Echarri and Bautista perfectly established the characters' young love in the pilot episode.

Echarri was also announced to star another lead role for a series adaptation of the Wattpad story “Kiss Master” alongside Kaori Oinuma and Joao Constancia.

In 2023, Echarri will top-bill in an action film for the first time. He will star in the movie titled "The Ride," alongside award-winning actor, Piolo Pascual. The film is about a father and son on the run.

Discography

Albums

Singles

Filmography

Film

Television/digital

Accolades

Notes

References

2003 births
Living people
Filipino child singers
Filipino male child actors
American musicians of Filipino descent
American people of Spanish descent
Singers from California
Singers from Cebu City
People from Orange County, California
The Voice Kids (Philippine TV series) contestants
21st-century American singers
21st-century Filipino singers
ABS-CBN personalities
Star Magic
Pinoy Big Brother contestants